Əyyublu (known as Aşağı Ayıblı until 2012) is a village and municipality in the Tovuz Rayon of Azerbaijan.

References 

Populated places in Tovuz District